John Fletcher Jellico (24 October 1856 – 9 August 1925) was a British/Irish sailor who competed in the 1908 Summer Olympics.

He was a crew member of the British boat Mouchette, which won the silver medal in the 12 metre class.

References

External links 
 
 

1856 births
1925 deaths
British male sailors (sport)
Sailors at the 1908 Summer Olympics – 12 Metre
Olympic sailors of Great Britain
Olympic silver medallists for Great Britain
Olympic medalists in sailing
Medalists at the 1908 Summer Olympics